The 1998 Botswana Premier League, also known as the 1998 Castle Super League for sponsorship reasons, was the 21st season of the Botswana Premier League. It was won by Notwane.

Season summary
The league was won by Notwane F.C., led by coach Paul Moyo. As of 2019, it is the last time Notwane have lifted the league title.

League table

References

Botswana Premier League